

The Ubuntu Forums is the official forum for the Ubuntu operating system.

As of May 2022, The Ubuntu Forums has 2.1 million registered members and more than 2.2 million threads. The Ubuntu Forums currently runs on the forum software vBulletin.

On July 20, 2013 the site was compromised, with attacker(s) both defacing the site and gaining access to "all user email addresses and hashed passwords"

The site was compromised once again on July 15, 2016. "Usernames, email addresses and IPs for 2 million users" were compromised but 'no active passwords' were accessed.

History

The Ubuntu Forums were created by Ryan Troy in October 2004. The forums became a popular resource for Ubuntu and were deemed the Official Ubuntu Forums in November 2004. The forums hosting continued to be paid for by Ryan and the occasional donations of forum community members until March 2006, when Canonical offered to host the forums on its own servers. In June 2007, the forums' domain name, license, and assets were all transferred to Canonical, which now has sole ownership.

Role

The primary function of The Ubuntu Forums is for Ubuntu support, but it also has a popular community area where other topics may be discussed.

Governance

The Ubuntu Forums are governed by a moderation team made up of volunteers, often referred to as The Forum Staff. The Forum Staff have three ranks: Administrators, Super Moderators and Moderators. The Administrators serve on the Forum Council.

See also 
 List of Internet forums

References

Computing websites
Internet properties established in 2004
Internet services supporting OpenID
Knowledge markets
Ubuntu